Robert Boyd Hibbs (April 20, 1932 – April 17, 2017) was suffragan bishop of the Episcopal Diocese of West Texas between 1995 and 2003.

Early life and education
Hibbs was born on April 20, 1932 in Philadelphia and was baptized on April 30, 1933. He studied at, and graduated from Trinity College with a Bachelor of Arts. Later he attended the General Theological Seminary and graduated in 1957 with a Bachelor of Sacred Theology.

Ordained Ministry 
Hibbs was ordained to the diaconate on June 1, 1957 by Bishop W. Blair Roberts, and to the priesthood on December 21, 1957 by Bishop Oliver J. Hart of Pennsylvania. Later he moved to Canada and completed postgraduate studies in Toronto. Afterwards he commenced missionary work in the Philippians and served on the faculty of St Andrew’s Theological Seminary in Quezon City. After his return to the United States in 1972, he became vicar of St Peter's Church in Borger, Texas until 1975 when he accepted the post of rector of St Stephen's Church in Lubbock, Texas. He taught at the Seminary of the Southwest between 1980 and 1983, before becoming rector of St Barnabas' Church in Fredericksburg, Texas. In 1988, he became assistant rector at the Church of the Good Shepherd in Corpus Christi, Texas.

Bishop
Hibbs was elected Suffragan Bishop of West Texas on September 9, 1995 on the third ballot  and consecrated on January 6, 1996 at the First United Methodist Church in Corpus Christi, Texas by Presiding Bishop Edmond L. Browning. He retired in December 2003 and died in San Antonio on April 17, 2017. He married Nancy Joane Alexander on August 24, 1957 and together had three children.

References

1932 births
2017 deaths
General Theological Seminary alumni
20th-century American Episcopalians
Episcopal bishops of West Texas